Tobin Frank is a Canadian musician, who records, performs and tours with the bands Spirit of the West and The Paperboys. Primarily a bass guitarist, Frank also plays some accordion and keyboard parts.

Frank joined Spirit of the West as a temporary guest musician on the tour to support their 1997 album Weights and Measures, following Linda McRae's departure from the band. He later became a permanent member of the band, and first appeared on the band's 2004 album Star Trails.

Frank has also been a guest performer on albums by numerous other Canadian artists such as The Town Pants, a Vancouver-based Celtic rock band.

Frank is from the Bulkley Valley area of British Columbia but resides permanently on Vancouver Island with his family. He attended Capilano College's Jazz Studies program in North Vancouver. He has played several times at the popular Midsummer Festival of Smither's BC.

Tobin has an older brother Psam Frank, who is also a keyboardist in a country band.

References

External links

Living people
Musicians from British Columbia
Canadian folk rock musicians
Spirit of the West members
20th-century Canadian bass guitarists
21st-century Canadian bass guitarists
20th-century Canadian keyboardists
21st-century Canadian keyboardists
Year of birth missing (living people)